Zosteraeschna is the scientific name of a genus of dragonflies from the family Aeshnidae. These relatively large dragonflies are also known as hawkers. They are dark brown with yellow-green markings; On the abdomens of the males, much of the top of S2 and base of S3 are blue.

Species
The genus Zosteraeschna includes the following species:
Zosteraeschna ellioti 
Zosteraeschna minuscula 
Zosteraeschna usambarica 

Some authorities treat Zosteraeschna usambarica as a subspecies of Zosteraeschna ellioti.

References

Aeshnidae
Anisoptera genera